The 1984 Great Britain Lions tour was the Great Britain national rugby league team's 17th tour of Australasia and took place from May to August 1984. A total of 24 matches were played against local club and representative sides during the tour, including a three match Test match series against Australia and New Zealand respectively, and one Test match against Papua New Guinea.

It was the first tour since 1950 in which Great Britain lost both series against Australia and New Zealand, and the first tour ever where they failed to win a Test against either team.

Touring squad 
In preparation for the tour, Great Britain coach Frank Myler and tour manager Dick Gemmell invited a squad of 44 players to attend a series of training camps during the summer of 1983. In February 1984, a squad of 41 players was named, which would participate in weekly training sessions at Fartown, Huddersfield. Some clubs were unhappy with being asked to release players during the middle of the season, most notably Widnes, who had 10 players selected for the training squad. Prior to the second Test match against France on 17 February 1984, Widnes refused to make their players available for the training sessions – John Basnett was the only Widnes player who attended. Myler responded by excluding the absent players from Test selection, with Basnett being the only Widnes player named thus far.

Prior to the final squad for the tour being named, a number of players became unavailable for selection for various reasons. Steve Evans was unavailable due to his wedding plans in the summer, while John Woods withdrew due to "family and business commitments". Peter Smith announced he would not be available due to a shoulder injury. David Watkinson was also ruled out due to injury, suffering a broken leg in the first Test match against France. David Hall had recently taken over a public house and asked not to be considered, while John Wood withdrew for family reasons.

A 30-man squad for the tour was selected in April 1984. The squad included 18-year-old Garry Schofield, who became Great Britain's youngest ever tourist. After the squad was named, Len Casey was dropped after receiving a six-month suspension, while Great Britain captain Trevor Skerrett was ruled out due to injury. Wayne Proctor and Chris Arkwright were called up as replacements, and Brian Noble was named as team captain in place of the injured Skerrett. Shortly before the tour departed, Arkwright was withdrawn from the squad on medical advice because of a damaged knee, and was replaced by Terry Flanagan.

Results

Australia

First Test

Second Test

Third Test

New Zealand

First Test

Second Test

Third Test

Papua New Guinea

Notes

References

Great Britain national rugby league team tours
Rugby league tours of Australia
Australia–United Kingdom relations
New Zealand–United Kingdom relations
Papua New Guinea–United Kingdom relations
Great Britain Lions tour
Great Britain Lions tour
Great Britain Lions tour
Rugby league tours of New Zealand
Rugby league tours of Papua New Guinea